"Tonight" (Korean: 투나잇; RR: Toonait) is a song by South Korean boy group Big Bang released on February 24, 2011, through YG Entertainment as the only single from the quintet's fourth extended play of the same name after a two-year hiatus. Written by members G-Dragon and T.O.P, the song peaked at number one on the Gaon Music Chart, and become one of the best-performing singles of 2011 in their home country.

Background and composition 

Following a two-year hiatus where members explored and experimented with different sounds, BigBang returned to South Korea with their 2011 Big Show concert, showcasing songs from the then-unreleased EP. Though the group's previous extended plays contained songs that were heavily influenced by electronic music, they opted to concentrate more on "warm rock music" for new materials. Released as the lead single, "Tonight" contained a "sophisticated electronic sound" paired with acoustic guitar. The song is "clearly grounded in dance-pop" a genre the quintet is known for. The track is built over "fist-pumping beats and applause", features "heavily autotuned vocals" and concludes "with sudden silence and then picking up again as if returning for an encore."

Reception

Billboard noted how "Tonight" was "more nuanced and sophisticated than many of [Big Bang's] previous club anthems," and hailed it "four-minute sonic journey" to one of the group's concerts. The magazine ranked it number ten on their list of BigBang's must-listen songs. KpopStarz choose it as one of BigBang's definite songs, while Sun-Times named it one of the group's ten best songs, calling the single a "slick party anthem".

"Tonight" debuted at number two on South Korea's Gaon Digital Chart, at number one on the Download Chart and five on the Streaming Chart. On its second week, the single rose to a peak position atop the Digital and the Streaming charts, while remaining at number one on the Download Chart.  Additionally, the single topped the Gaon BGM Chart upon release. By the end of 2011, "Tonight" was the eighth best-performing single of the year in South Korea, with over 2.3 million downloads sold.  With over 23 million streams, the song was the tenth most streamed of 2011.

Accolades

Charts

Weekly charts

Monthly charts

Year-end charts

Sales and certifications

References

External links
 

BigBang (South Korean band) songs
YG Entertainment singles
Korean-language songs
Songs written by G-Dragon
Songs written by T.O.P
Gaon Digital Chart number-one singles
2011 singles
2011 songs